Călmățuiu de Sus (called Băsești until 1968) is a commune in Teleorman County, Muntenia, Romania. It is composed of three villages: Băcălești, Călmățuiu de Sus and Ionașcu.

References

Communes in Teleorman County
Localities in Muntenia